Ematurga atomaria, the common heath, is a moth of the family Geometridae.

The species can be found in the Palearctic realm  from the Iberian Peninsula in the west, central and eastern Europe and east to Siberia and Sakhalin. In the south, its range includes the northern Mediterranean and the Turkish part of the Black Sea region.

The colour is variable ranging from yellow brown to dark brown. The appearance is mottled with bands and spots. The brown cross bands on both forewings and hindwings vary in width and there may be no cross bands at all only small dark brownish spots. Males have comb-like antennae. Females are usually brown with a dusting of white but can be almost white with a series of brown crosslines.
The egg is elongated and green to yellow-red. The caterpillar is slim, smooth and up to 30 millimeters long. The colour is very variable as with the moth; it ranges from brown to yellowish, grey to violet-grey. The dorsal line is dark, the side stripes light and wavy. The pupa is yellow-brown and spotted. The cremaster is long and forked at the end.

The moths fly in one generation from May to June in the British Isles. In other parts of the range there is a second generation from June to September. The caterpillars feed on a heather, heath and clovers.

Notes

References

External links

Lepidoptera of Belgium
Lepiforum.de
Moths and Butterflies of Europe and North Africa
UK Moths
Vlindernet.nl 

Boarmiini
Moths described in 1758
Moths of Europe
Moths of Asia
Taxa named by Carl Linnaeus